Benedito de Assis da Silva (November 12, 1952 – July 6, 2014), commonly known as Assis was a Brazilian footballer who achieved fame playing for Fluminense. More recently he was working as a manager for Fluminense's youth team.

Assis died on July 6, 2014, due to multiple organ failure at the age of 61.

Honours
 São Paulo
Campeonato Paulista: 1980
 Internacional
Campeonato Gaúcho: 1981
 Atlético Paranaense
Campeonato Paranaense: 1982
 Fluminense
Campeonato Carioca: 1983, 1984, 1985
Campeonato Brasileiro Série A: 1984

References

1952 births
2014 deaths
Brazilian footballers
São Paulo FC players
Sport Club Internacional players
Club Athletico Paranaense players
Fluminense FC players
Association football forwards
Footballers from São Paulo